John Von Ohlen (May 13, 1941 Indianapolis, Indiana – October 3, 2018,  Cincinnati, Ohio) was an American jazz drummer who worked for Woody Herman in 1967 and 1969, then with Stan Kenton from 1970 to 1972. He began playing Trombone in middle school, and played through high school. He graduated from North Central High School in 1960. He then went to North Texas State briefly, but returned to Indianapolis shortly after.

Von Ohlen led the Blue Wisp Big Band in Cincinnati from 1980 to 2018, and his own groups under his name ranging from quartets to big band.  From 1967 to 1968, Von Ohlen toured with Billy Maxted’s Manhattan Jazz Band.  In the 1980s and 1990s, Von Ohlen was a member of a big band led by the pianist Steve Allee.

Von Ohlen died on October 3, 2018 at the age of 77.

Discography 
 John Von Ohlen – The Baron
 John Von Ohlen & Steve Allee Big Band – Live

With Blue Wisp Big Band
 The Blue Wisp Band of Cincinnati
 Butterfly
 The Smooth One
 Live at Carmelo's
 Rollin' with Von Ohlen
 Tribute
 20th Anniversary

With Stan Kenton
 Live at Redlands University
 Today
 Live at Brigham Young University
 The Ballad Style of Stan Kenton

With others
 Chuck Carter/Steve Allee Big Band – Downtown Blues
 Woody Herman – Concerto for Herd
 Cal Collins – Crack'd Rib

References

1941 births
2018 deaths
American jazz drummers
American jazz composers
American male jazz composers
Bebop drummers
Big band drummers
American jazz bandleaders
Mainstream jazz drummers
Swing drummers
Jazz musicians from Ohio
Musicians from Cincinnati
Musicians from Indianapolis
20th-century American drummers
American male drummers
20th-century American male musicians